Phalaenopsis fuscata is a species of orchid endemic to western and central Malesia.

External links

fuscata